Frisz & Sympatisz is the sixth studio album by Dutch rock and roll and blues group Herman Brood & His Wild Romance. The album was produced by Tom Barlage.

Track listing

Personnel
Herman Brood - piano, keyboards, vocals
Bertus Borgers - saxophone
Wally Langdon - bass
David Hollestelle - guitar, keyboards
Roger Angelo - drums
Robbie Schmitz - vocals
Tom Barlage - producer

References 

1982 albums
Herman Brood & His Wild Romance albums